Wessel Nijman (born 26 June 2000) is a professional Dutch darts player.

He played in PDC Development Tour events, and won his first title in 2018, defeating Bradley Brooks in the final. Nijman was able to qualify for the 2019 Czech Darts Open in Prague as an Associate Member qualifier, but was beaten 6–0 by Corey Cadby in the first round. He also qualified for the 2019 Gibraltar Darts Trophy, where he won 6–5 against Darren Webster before losing to Mensur Suljović. Nijman also won a Development Tour event in 2020.

In 2020 Nijman was suspended for fixing a game against David Evans in the Modus A Night at the Darts event. Nijman admitted having taken payment to ensure he would lose the match 4–0. The Darts Regulation Authority banned Nijman for five years starting from 18 August 2020, with the latter two and a half years of that ban suspended.

References

External links

2000 births
Living people
Dutch darts players
Professional Darts Corporation associate players
Match fixers